The 2021–22 Hsinchu JKO Lioneers season was the franchise's 2nd season, its second season in the P. LEAGUE+ (PLG), its 2nd in Hsinchu County. The Lioneers are coached by Lin Kuan-Lun in his second year as head coach.

Draft

Standings

Roster

Game log

Taiwan 3x3 Basketball Association

Round 1

Round 2

Round 3

Round 4

Round 5

Round 6

Round 7

Final

Hsinchu JKO Lioneers Masters Game

Preseason

Invitation Game

Regular season

Playoffs

Finals

Player Statistics 
<noinclude>

Regular season

Playoffs

Finals

 Reference：

Transactions

Free Agency

Re-signed

Additions

Subtractions

Awards

End-of-Season Awards

Players of the Month

Players of the Week

References 

Hsinchu JKO Lioneers seasons
Hsinchu JKO Lioneers